Below is the list of populated places in Isparta Province, Turkey by the districts. In the following lists first place in each list is the administrative center of the district.

Isparta

 Isparta
 Aliköy, Isparta		
 Bozanönü, Isparta		
 Büyükgökçeli, Isparta		
 Büyükhacılar, Isparta		
 Çobanisa, Isparta		
 Çukurköy, Isparta		
 Darıderesi, Isparta		
 Darıören, Isparta		
 Deregümü, Isparta		
 Direkli, Isparta		
 Gelincik, Isparta		
 Güneyce, Isparta		
 Kadılar, Isparta		
 Kayıköy, Isparta		
 Kışlaköy, Isparta		
 Kuleönü, Isparta		
 Küçükgökçeli, Isparta		
 Küçükhacılar, Isparta		
 Küçükkışla, Isparta		
 Savköy, Isparta		
 Yakaören, Isparta		
 Yazısöğüt, Isparta

Aksu 

 Aksu		
 Eldere, Aksu		
 Elecik, Aksu		
 Karacahisar, Aksu		
 Karağı, Aksu		
 Katip, Aksu		
 Koçular, Aksu		
 Kösre, Aksu		
 Sofular, Aksu		
 Terziler, Aksu		
 Yaka, Aksu		
 Yakaafşar, Aksu		
 Yılanlı, Aksu		
 Yukarıyaylabel, Aksu

Atabey 

 Atabey		
 Bayat, Atabey		
 Harmanören, Atabey		
 İslamköy, Atabey		
 Kapıcak, Atabey		
 Pembeli, Atabey

Eğirdir

 Eğirdir		
 Ağılköy, Eğirdir		
 Akbelenli, Eğirdir		
 Akdoğan, Eğirdir		
 Akpınar, Eğirdir		
 Aşağı Gökdere, Eğirdir		
 Bademli, Eğirdir		
 Bağıcık, Eğirdir		
 Bağıllı, Eğirdir		
 Bağören, Eğirdir		
 Balkırı, Eğirdir		
 Barla, Eğirdir		
 Beydere, Eğirdir		
 Çay, Eğirdir		
 Eyüpler, Eğirdir		
 Gökçehöyük, Eğirdir		
 Havutlu, Eğirdir		
 Kırıntı, Eğirdir		
 Mahmatlar, Eğirdir		
 Pazarköy, Eğirdir		
 Sarıidris, Eğirdir		
 Serpil, Eğirdir		
 Sevinçbey, Eğirdir		
 Sipahiler, Eğirdir		
 Sorkuncak, Eğirdir		
 Tepeli, Eğirdir		
 Yılgıncak, Eğirdir		
 Yukarı Gökdere, Eğirdir		
 Yuvalı, Eğirdir

Gelendost 

 Gelendost
 Afşar, Gelendost		
 Akdağ, Gelendost		
 Bağıllı, Gelendost		
 Balcı, Gelendost		
 Çaltı, Gelendost		
 Esinyurt, Gelendost		
 Hacılar, Gelendost		
 Keçili, Gelendost		
 Köke, Gelendost		
 Madenli, Gelendost		
 Yaka, Gelendost		
 Yenice, Gelendost		
 Yeşilköy, Gelendost

Gönen

 Gönen		
 Gölbaşı, Gönen		
 Gümüşgün, Gönen		
 Güneykent, Gönen		
 İğdecik, Gönen		
 Kızılcık, Gönen		
 Koçtepe, Gönen		
 Senirce, Gönen

Keçiborlu 

 Keçiborlu		
 Ardıçlı, Keçiborlul		
 Aydoğmuş, Keçiborlul		
 Çukurören, Keçiborlul		
 Gülköy, Keçiborlul		
 İncesu, Keçiborlul		
 Kaplanlı, Keçiborlul		
 Kavakköy, Keçiborlul		
 Kılıç, Keçiborlul		
 Kozluca, Keçiborlul		
 Kuyucak, Keçiborlul		
 Özbahçe, Keçiborlul		
 Saracık, Keçiborlul		
 Senir, Keçiborlul		
 Yenitepe, Keçiborlul		
 Yeşilyurt, Keçiborlul

Senirkent 

 Senirkent
 Akkeçili, Senirkent		
 Başköy, Senirkent		
 Büyükkabaca, Senirkent		
 Gençali, Senirkent		
 Karip, Senirkent		
 Ortayazı, Senirkent		
 Uluğbey, Senirkent		
 Yassıören, Senirkent

Sütçüler 

 Sütçüler		
 Ayvalıpınar, Sütçüler		
 Aşağıyaylabel, Sütçüler		
 Bekirağalar, Sütçüler		
 Belence, Sütçüler		
 Beydili, Sütçüler		
 Boğazköy, Sütçüler		
 Bucakdere, Sütçüler		
 Çukurca, Sütçüler		
 Çandır, Sütçüler		
 Çobanisa, Sütçüler		
 Darıbükü, Sütçüler		
 Güldalı, Sütçüler		
 Gümü, Sütçüler		
 Hacıahmetler, Sütçüler		
 Hacıaliler, Sütçüler		
 İbişler, Sütçüler		
 İncedere, Sütçüler		
 Karadiken, Sütçüler		
 Kasımlar, Sütçüler		
 Kesme, Sütçüler		
 Kuzca, Sütçüler		
 Melikler, Sütçüler		
 Müezzinler, Sütçüler		
 Pınarköy, Sütçüler		
 Sağrak, Sütçüler		
 Saray, Sütçüler		
 Sarımehmetler, Sütçüler		
 Şehler, Sütçüler		
 Yeniköy, Sütçüler		
 Yeşilyurt, Sütçüler

Şarkikaraağaç 

 Şarkikaraağaç		
 Arak, Şarkikaraağaç		
 Armutlu, Şarkikaraağaç		
 Aslandoğmuş, Şarkikaraağaç		
 Aşağıdinek, Şarkikaraağaç		
 Başdeğirmen, Şarkikaraağaç		
 Belceğiz, Şarkikaraağaç		
 Beyköy, Şarkikaraağaç		
 Çaltı, Şarkikaraağaç		
 Çarıksaraylar, Şarkikaraağaç		
 Çavundur, Şarkikaraağaç		
 Çeltek, Şarkikaraağaç		
 Çiçekpınar, Şarkikaraağaç		
 Fakılar, Şarkikaraağaç		
 Gedikli, Şarkikaraağaç		
 Göksöğüt, Şarkikaraağaç		
 Karayaka, Şarkikaraağaç		
 Kıyakdede, Şarkikaraağaç		
 Köprü, Şarkikaraağaç		
 Muratbağı, Şarkikaraağaç		
 Ördekci, Şarkikaraağaç		
 Örenköy, Şarkikaraağaç		
 Salur, Şarkikaraağaç		
 Sarıkaya, Şarkikaraağaç		
 Yakaemir, Şarkikaraağaç		
 Yassıbel, Şarkikaraağaç		
 Yenicekale, Şarkikaraağaç		
 Yeniköy, Şarkikaraağaç		
 Yukarıdinek, Şarkikaraağaç

Uluborlu

 Uluborlu		
 Dere, Uluborlu		
 İleydağı, Uluborlu		
 İnhisar, Uluborlu		
 Küçükkabaca, Uluborlu

Yalvaç 

 Yalvaç		
 Akçaşar, Yalvaç		
 Altıkapı, Yalvaç		
 Aşağıkaşıkara, Yalvaç		
 Aşağıtırtar, Yalvaç		
 Ayvalı, Yalvaç		
 Bağlarbaşı, Yalvaç		
 Bağkonak, Yalvaç		
 Bahtiyar, Yalvaç		
 Celeptaş, Yalvaç		
 Çakırçal, Yalvaç		
 Çamharman, Yalvaç		
 Çetince, Yalvaç		
 Dedeçam, Yalvaç		
 Eğirler, Yalvaç		
 Eyüpler, Yalvaç		
 Hisarardı, Yalvaç		
 Gökçeali, Yalvaç		
 Hüyüklü, Yalvaç		
 İleği, Yalvaç		
 Koruyaka, Yalvaç		
 Kozluçay, Yalvaç		
 Körküler, Yalvaç		
 Kumdanlı, Yalvaç		
 Kurusarı, Yalvaç		
 Kuyucak, Yalvaç		
 Mısırlı, Yalvaç		
 Özbayat, Yalvaç		
 (B) Özgüney, Yalvaç		
 Sağırköy, Yalvaç		
 Sücüllü, Yalvaç		
 Taşevi, Yalvaç		
 Terziler, Yalvaç		
 Tokmacık, Yalvaç		
 Yağcılar, Yalvaç		
 Yarıkkaya, Yalvaç		
 Yukarıkaşıkara, Yalvaç		
 Yukarıtırtar, Yalvaç

Yenişarbademli 

 Yenişarbademli		
 Gölkonak, Yenişarbademli

References

Isparta Province
List
Mediterranean Region, Turkey